Hermanni is a neighbourhood in Central major district of Helsinki, Finland. , Hermanni has 5,124 inhabitants living in an area of 1.05 km2. Hermanni is part of Vallila district.

Hermanni's well-known areas include Teurastamo, known as a popular food and city culture hub, which once housed the city's historic slaughterhouse from 1933 to 1992.

Politics
Results of the 2011 Finnish parliamentary election in Hermanni:

Green League   19.8%
Left Alliance   19.8%
Social Democratic Party   19.3%
National Coalition Party   16.9%
True Finns   12.7%
Centre Party   3.3%
Swedish People's Party   3.3%
Christian Democrats   1.9%

References

Neighbourhoods of Helsinki